Jill Rips (also known as Jill the Ripper and Tied Up) is a 2000 Canadian-American film directed by Anthony Hickox starring Dolph Lundgren, based on a 1987 novel by Scottish  writer Frederic Lindsay.

Plot
Matt Sorenson, a former boxer and San Francisco cop, now makes a living collecting debts for small businesses. The brutal death of his high-powered younger brother, Michael, changes all that forever. Intent on finding his brother's killer, Sorenson infiltrates the powerful inner world of politics, business intrigue, and casual sex. Rejecting the police and media theory that the murder is the work of a female prostitute, Sorensen's focus falls on the corrupt big city businessman, Jim Conway. His obsession to discover the killer's identity mounts as other men are found murdered in a similar fashion. Sorenson loses all objectivity and becomes a vigilante.

Cast

Dolph Lundgren as Matt Sorenson 
Danielle Brett as Irene 
Richard Fitzpatrick as Eddie
Kristi Angus as Frances
Charles Seixas as "Big Jim" Conway 
Sandi Ross as Mary O. 
Greg Ellwand as Peerse
Victor Pedtrchenko as Joe Jujavia
Kylie Bax as Serena

Release

Home media
After a TV premiere on HBO under the alternate title Tied Up in January 2000, the movie was released on DVD on July 4, 2000 by Columbia TriStar Home Entertainment as Jill the Ripper (while keeping its original title Jill Rips in other countries).

Reception

Novel reviews
The novel had been described by the Today programme as 'harrowing, but [its] grim, poetic vision makes it the best novel of its kind for years'.
The Sunday Times said that 'violent and vicious, Lindsay's unsparing tale beds down with the imagination like a succubus'.
Daily Express called it 'tautly and skillfully written—a genuine, can't-put-it-down, turn-off-the-telly-read'.

References

External links

2000 films
Films directed by Anthony Hickox
1990s thriller films
BDSM in films
Franchise Pictures films
Films based on British novels
2000s English-language films
1990s English-language films